Pohang is a city in the province of North Gyeongsang, South Korea, and a main seaport in the Daegu-Gyeongbuk region. The built-up area of Pohang is located on the alluvium of the mouth of the Hyeongsan River. The city is divided into two wards (gu), Buk-gu or Northern Ward and Nam-gu or Southern Ward.

This city has the largest population of North Gyeongsang Province and it has the third-largest land area of any city (si) in South Korea.

History

The earliest evidence of human occupation in the Pohang area is from the Mumun Pottery Period (1500–300 BC). Archaeologists have unearthed small villages and megalithic burials (dolmen) from this period. Still a small fishing village at the dawn of the 20th century, the earliest steps toward developing Pohang into a place of greater significance were taken in 1930 with the construction of a modern harbour. Pohang grew rapidly afterward, attaining the designation of town (eup) in 1931 and then earning the status of city (si) in 1949.

Pohang's road arteries and shipping port made it a place of strategic significance during the Korean War. An unopposed landing of UN forces at Pohang on July 18, 1950 was the first large-scale amphibious operation since World War II, and the region around Pohang saw fierce clashes between South Korea's 3rd Infantry Division and North Korea's 5th Infantry Division during August–September 1950.

By the 1960s, Pohang was a small coastal city with a population of 50,000. The next major development in Pohang's growth came in 1968 with the inauguration of the steel maker POSCO, and the local plant's commencement of production in 1972. The introduction of heavy industry to the city brought the local economy to a blend of iron, steel, shipbuilding and fisheries through the end of the 20th century.

The early 21st century and the age of globalization has brought new economic challenges to companies such as POSCO, giving rise to beliefs that Pohang would be wise to not be overly reliant on heavy industry to maintain its prosperity. In response, the Pohang of today presents itself as having an eye to the future, striving to become a diversified city of environmentalism and advanced learning, as well as a centre of arts and culture.

During the Silla Dynasty the area was made up of four hyeon, Toehwa-hyeon, Jidap-hyeon, Geunoji-hyeon, Haea-hyeon. Then during the Goryeo Dynasty these four were renamed to Heunghae-gun (흥해군/), Janggi-hyeon, Yeongil-hyeon, Cheongha-hyeon respectively.

On 4 August 1896, the three remaining hyeon, which at that time were Janggi, Yeonil (originally Yeongil) and Cheongha were reassigned as counties or gun as part of the change to the 13-province division of the Korean Empire.

On 1 March 1914, the four counties were unified as one Yeongil-gun, which was subdivided into 18 myeons.

On 1 April 1931, Pohang-myeon was designated as an eup, thus giving Yeongil-gun 1 eup and 17 myeon.

On 1 April 1934, Jukbuk-myeon and Juknam-myeon were united to make Jukjang-myeon, while Janggi-myeon and Bongsan-myeon united to make Jihaeng-myeon, so that there were 1 eup and 15 myeon.

On 1 October 1938, Hyeongsan-myeon was incorporated into Pohang-eup, leaving Yeongil-gun with 1 eup and 14 myeon.

On 1 October 1942 Changju-myeon was renamed and reclassified as Guryongpo-eup (구룡포읍/九龍浦邑), leaving 2 eup and 13 myeon.

On 15 August 1949, Pohang-eup was designated as Pohang-si, leaving Yeongil with 1 si, 1 eup, 13 myeon and 1 local office.

On 8 July 1956, Heunghae-myeon and Gokgang-myeon  are incorporated into Uichang-myeon leaving 1 si, 1 eup and 12 myeon.

On 29 October 1957, Daljeon-myeon is abolished and incorporated into Heunghae-myeon and Yeonil-myeon leaving 1 si, 1 eup and 11 myeons.

On 1 March 1967, the Gibuk Local Office of Gigye-myeon (기계면/) is established.

On 1 July 1973, Uichang-myeon is designated as Uichang-eup leaving 1 si, 2 eup, 10 myeon and 3 local offices.

On 1 December 1980, Yeonil-myeon and Ocheon-myeon are both designated as eup leaving 1 si, 4 eup, 8 myeon and 3 local offices.

On 1 September 1982, Haedo-dong and Sangdae-dong are separated into Haedo 1 and 2-dong and Sangdae 1 and 2-dong respectively.

On 1 April 1986, Daebo Local Office and Gibuk Local Office are designated as myeon leaving 1 si, 4 eup, 10 myeon and 1 local office.

On 1 January 1995, a united Pohang-si absorbs all of Yeongil-gun, composed of 1 si, 2 gu, 4 eup, 10 myeon, 25 dong and 1 local office.

On 1 September 1998, the unification of Small-dong left Pohang with 1 si, 2 gu, 4 eup, 10 myeon, 19 dong and 1 local office.

On 1 January 2009, the unification of Small-dong left Pohang with 1 si, 2 gu, 4 eup, 10 myeon, 15 dong and 1 local office.

Geography and climate
Under the Köppen climate classification, Pohang has a humid subtropical climate (Cfa).
The mean temperature in the coldest month, January, is relatively mild at 2.2 °C. The warmest month is August, when the mean temperature is 26.0 °C. On average, Pohang receives 1,152 mm of precipitation per year. The driest month is December, when the city receives a scant 25.7 mm of precipitation on average. However, the mean amount of precipitation for the wettest month, August, is 227.4 mm.

Administrative Organization

 Head office: 1 head office, 4 office, 6 team, 25 department
 Executive office: 1 office 7 experts
 Direct organizations: three centers and six departments
 Business offices: 11 offices and 7 departments
 Nam-gu and Buk-gu office: 12 departments Eup, Myeon and Dong: 4 Eup, 10 Myeon and 15 Dong
 (The number of public officials: 1,960)
Mayor
Globalization strategy headquarter
Self-governing Administration Bureau
Economy & Industries Bureau
Welfare environment office
Construct and Urban Planning Bureau
Nam-gu & Buk-gu Public Health Centers
Agricultural Technology Center
Construction Environment Office
Water Supply Office
Other Centers
 
Culture & Arts Center

Municipal library

Municipal art gallery

Agricultural product wholesale market management office

Women's culture center

Park management office

Vehicle Registration Office

Transportation
The city is served by several trains a day from Seoul and Daegu. Pohang is the terminus for a number of ferry routes serving the adjacent Sea of Japan, including the main tourist route for Ulleung Island and Liancourt Rocks. 
Pohang is the home of POSCO (the Pohang Steel Company), one of the largest steel producers in the world, and a host of related industries. As a result, the port shipped a total of 54.8 million tons in 2006.

Several flights per day to Seoul Gimpo Airport and Jeju Airport are available at Pohang Gyeongju Airport.

Local transportation is served by only city buses. They run about 20 different ways of the city and some of them reach to the mountain folk. Also, the buses are classified into 2 kinds – one is Ilban-bus (normal bus) and the other is Jwaseok-bus (full of seats and a little more expensive than Ilban-bus). They run 15~25 minutes intervals along their own way. The bus routes are listed in both Korean  and English but the Korean version is interactive, and thus more helpful.

There are two main bus terminals - Shiwae (시외) and Gosok (고속) which roughly translate into intercity/city and express. The Shiwae bus terminal (시외버스터미널) also acts as the cross-country bus terminal from which access to nearby metropolitan cities such as Daegu and Busan (~1.5 hrs each depending on traffic) is available. Their website is only in Korean and only accessible in Internet Explorer. The Gosok bus terminal (고속버스터미널) website is in both English and Korean.  From Gosok bus terminal one can travel to Seoul, Gwangju, and Daejeon.

Pohang is also serviced by two train stations - Pohang station (포항역) and Wolpo station (월포역). Times and destinations are available on the Korail website which is in English and Korean.

Passengers using the KTX had to go to Gyeongju Station (경주역) until 2015. However, since 2015, the KTX travels directly to Pohang Station (포항역).

Education

Universities with graduate schools
Pohang University of Science and Technology (POSTECH)
Handong Global University

Other institutes of higher education
Pohang College
Sunlin College

Health 
There are some hospitals to treat people; two types of hospitals exist: public, and private. Public hospitals are run by the government, and supported by the government. Conversely, private hospitals are managed by the individuals. For example, S Pohang hospital is sponsored by the Ministry of Public Administration and Security which means it is supported by the government ("Introduction of the hospital" 1). They provide the treatments of brain disease, and spine disease. For private hospital, Pohang Sunlin Hospital is run by Hyunsu Shin ("Introduction of the head of the hospital" 1).

Culture

Thousands flock to see the fireworks festival at Yeongildae Beach each summer. People travel from all over the country to watch the show.
The Culture & Arts Center, opened in 1995, holds performances and exhibitions in its various galleries and theaters. Pohang is known for gwamegi and holds an annual Gwamegi Festival. Gwamegi Festival is available on November annually. In 2015, the festival invited individuals from different ages. Numerous people can enjoy the festival, and the festival is sponsored by banks such as Suhyeop, Nonghyeop, Shinhan, and POSCO. During the festival, it is available to experience the old traditional Korean culture such as competing with person who sell Yeot. Furthermore, many singers from various places including Philippines are invited to demonstrate their talent to people ("Schedule" 1). In this place, Guryongpo, it is possible to try Gwamegi, Pidegi which is dried squid, and big crabs ("Information about the products in Guryongpo" 1).

Museums 

 Guryongpo Gwamegi Culture Museum
 Guryongpo Modern History Museum
 The National Lighthouse Museum
 Yeongil Folk History Museum
 The Posco Museum
 Pohang Museum Of Steel Art
 Pohang Canal PR Hall
Robo Life Museum

Monuments 

 Sabang Memorial Park
 Saemaul Memorial Hall
 New Millennium Memorial Hall

Villages 

 Deokdong Culture Village
 Duksil Village
 Sangok-ri

Experiences 

 Botanical Garden of Gyeongsangbukdo
 Yeonorang Seonyeo Theme Park
 Key-Chungsan Botanical Garden
 Yeongilman Cruise
 Pohang Ship Experience

Other important spots 

 Posco
 Pohang Accelerator Laboratory
 Korea Institute of Robotics & Technology Convergence

Architecture

Historical 

 Bogyeongsa Temple
 Oeosa Temple

Sports

The city is home to the Pohang Steelers of K League 1.
Also, there is the Pohang Baseball Stadium, which Samsung Lions belonging to KBO League is using as the second stadium.

Points of interest
The Jukdo Market is a large, bustling traditional market near the centre of the city, close to the port. It is well known throughout Korea as an important seafood market. There are many raw-fish restaurants in the market. The fish is cheaper here than in Seoul or Daegu.

Bukbu Beach is located in Duho-dong in the northern part of the city's built-up area. The beach front has been the focus of commercial developments such as bars, restaurants, and budget accommodations called Yeogwan. A number of beaches on the Sea of Japan can be found just north of the built-up area, including Chilpo and Wolpo.

Homigot, a point of land jutting out into the Sea of Japan, is located to the east of urban Pohang in Daebo-myeon. Homigot is one of the easternmost points on the Korean peninsula and as such serves every year as a gathering place for thousands to greet Korea's first sunrise of the New Year. The beach is also home to the 'Hands of Harmony' sculpture.

Bogyeongsa is a major Buddhist temple nestled in a steep green valley at the foot of Mount Naeyeon (710 m) in Songna-myeon, an area in the extreme northern part of Pohang. Yeonsan Waterfall is located nearby in the same mountain valley. There are hiking trails leading from the temple up into the mountains. Bogyeongsa also has a number of mountain hermitages in the vicinity.

Oeosa is a temple located in the extreme southern part of Pohang, just inside the mountains south of the coastal plain formed by the Naengcheon River. It is located at the foot of Mt. Unjae (481 m) in a steep valley in Daesong-myeon. Signs placed in and around Oeosa claim that the temple was founded by Wonhyo, the well-travelled Silla monk.

Notable people
 Lee Myung-bak, former South Korean President
 Lee Ho-yang (known in the West as Shinsadong Tiger), composer and record producer
 Chan Sung Jung, mixed martial artist, UFC fighter.
 Song Ji-hyo, actress and variety star
 Ray, member of South Korean boy band C-Clown
 Lee Dong-gook, soccer player with Jeonbuk Hyundai Motors
 JinE (Real Name: Shin Hye-jin, Hangul: 신혜진), former member of South Korean girl band Oh My Girl
 Lee Chaeyoung, member of South Korean girl band Fromis 9
 Kang Yeosang (known as Yeosang),  member of South Korean boy band ATEEZ
 Yoo Seung-ho, actor in films including The Way Home
 Lee Jaehyeong (known as Jaehyeong), member of South Korean rock band The Rose
 Kim Yong-seung (known as Yongseung), member of South Korean boy band VERIVERY
Son Min-Soo, a former comedy actor and now a YouTube creator(Enjoycouple).
 Bae Sumin (known as Sumin), leader of South Korean girl band STAYC

Shopping
The main downtown shopping area is between Yukgeori (육거리) and Ogeori (오거리) which translate to 6-way intersection and 5-way intersection. The streamlet boardwalk shopping area opens and ends with Pohang Station and Yukgeori, respectively. This shopping area has several stores, restaurants, and a few bars including Converse, Shoemarker, Skin Food, ABC Mart, Redface, The North Face, a cinema, Starbucks, Mr. Pizza, Whistler Bar, Beethoven Bar, Mindy's Bar, etc.

Groceries
Pohang has a few major grocer stores including two Home Plus locations, two GS Supermarkets, and two E-marts. One Home Plus is by the Shiwae bus terminal and the other is closer to Jukdo Market. Jukdo market is an open market where you can purchase clothes, fish, produce, and a plethora of items. The one GS supermarket is in Jukdo-dong whereas the other is in Duho-dong.  E-marts are located in I-dong and in Indeok-dong.

Administrative divisions 

Pohang is divided into 2 non-autonomous districts, which in turn is divided into 4 eup, 10 myeon and 15 dong.

Twin towns – sister cities

Pohang is twinned with:

 Fukuyama, Japan
 Hunchun, China
 İzmit, Turkey
 Jōetsu, Japan
 Pittsburg, United States
 Vladivostok, Russia

Friendly cities
Pohang is cooperating with:
 North Shore City, New Zealand (August 2008)
 Zhangjiagang, China

See also
 2017 Pohang earthquake
 Beopgwangsa
 List of cities in South Korea
 Wongaksa (Gigye, Pohang)

References

References 2 
 Jump up^ 포항공항(Pohang Airport Website) > 고객센터(Service Center) > 공지사항(Announcement) > 포항공항 휴지기간 공지(Announcement about the pause of Pohang Airport)
 Jump up^ 포항공항(Pohang Airport Website) > 운항현황(Flight Situation) > 실시간 운항정보(Information about current flight available)
 Jump up^ 시설관리공단(Organization which manage facilities) > 포항야구장 (Pohang Baseball Stadium) > 시설소개(Introduction about the facility)
 Jump up^ 메인(main website) > 홈 (Home) > 작은뉴스(Jakeun News)
 Jump up^ 과메기 포항구룡포(Gwamegi Pohang Guryongpo) > 구룡포 특산물(Products in Guryongpo)
 Jump up^ 에스포항병원(S Pohang Hospital) > 병원소개(Introduction of the hospital)
 Jump up^ 선린병원(Sunlin Hospital) > 선린병원소개(Introduction of the hospital) > 병원장 인사말(Introduction of the head of the hospital)
 Jump up^ 대한민국 해병대(Marine in South Korea) > 해병대모집(gathering people) > 모병문의처(Inquiry for each locals)
 Jump up^ 대한민국 해병대(Marine in South Korea) > 해병대모집(gathering people) > 지원 FAQ(Enrolling FAQ)

External links

City government website
Official Pohang Airport website
The website that shows the lists of the games that will be hosted in Pohang Baseball Stadium
The website of the news
The main website of S Pohang Hospital
The main website of Sunlin Hospital
The official website of Marine in South Korea

Citation 
"Announcement about the Pause of Pohang Airport." Pohang Airport. Governor of Pohang, 17 Feb. 2016. Web.

"포항공항(Pohang Airport)." 실시간 운항정보(Flights in Real Time). N.p., n.d. Web. 18 Mar. 2016.

"포항야구장(Pohang Baseball Stadium)." 시설소개. 시설관리공단(Organization That Manages Facility), n.d. Web. 18 Mar. 2016.

Kim, Minje. "전체기사(Whole Articles)." 전체기사(Whole Articles). Jakeun News, 16 Dec. 2015. Web. 18 Mar. 2016.

Kim, Jumdol. "구룡포 과메기 축제(Guryongpo Gwamegi Festival)." 구룡포 과메기 축제(Guryongpo Gwamegi Festival). Jumdol Kim, n.d. Web. 18 Mar. 2016.

"보건복지부 인증 전문병원-에스포항병원(뇌센터, 척추센터)!! :: 병원소개(S Pohang Hospital Introduction of the Hospital)." 보건복지부 인증 전문병원-에스포항병원(뇌센터, 척추센터)!! :: 병원소개(S Pohang Hospital Introduction of the Hospital). Executives and Staff Members, Dec. 2008. Web. 18 Mar. 2016.

Shin, Hyunsu. "병원장 인사말(Introduction by the Head of the Hospital)." Sunlin Hospital. Hyunsu Shin, n.d. Web. 18 Mar. 2016.

"지역별 문의처(Inquiry for Locals)." Marine in South Korea. N.p., n.d. Web. 18 Mar. 2016.

"지원 FAQ(enrolling FAQ)." Marine in South Korea. N.p., n.d. Web. 18 Mar. 2016.
 

 
Cities in North Gyeongsang Province
Port cities and towns in South Korea